Gondia Lok Sabha constituency was a Lok Sabha (Parliamentary) constituency of Maharashtra state in western India. This constituency was in existence during Lok Sabha elections of 1962 for the 3rd Lok Sabha. It was abolished from next 1967 Lok Sabha elections. It was reserved for Scheduled Caste candidate.

Members of the Parliament

1952-1961: Constituency does not exist
1962: Balkrishna Ramchandra Wasnik, Indian National Congress (as Gondia (SC) ( Constituency no 34 of Maharashtra State ) )
1967 onwards: Constituency does not exist

See Bhandara Lok Sabha constituency

See also
 Bhandara-Gondiya Lok Sabha constituency ( 2009 elections of 15th Lok Sabha onwards)
 Bhandara Lok Sabha constituency ( 1951 to 2004 elections for 1st to 14th Lok Sabha )
 Chimur Lok Sabha constituency
 List of former constituencies of the Lok Sabha
 Gondia district
 Bhandara district

References

Former constituencies of the Lok Sabha
Former Lok Sabha constituencies of Maharashtra
1967 disestablishments in India
Constituencies disestablished in 1967
1962 establishments in Maharashtra